Sudeta may refer to:

Sudetes, Polish mountain range 
Đuro Sudeta, Croatian writer